"A Little Boy Lost" is a poem of the Songs of Experience series created in 1794 after the Songs of Innocence (1789) by the poet William Blake. The poem centers on the theme of religious persecution and the corrupted dictates of dogmatic Church teachings. As part of Songs of Experience the poem is set in the wider context of exploring the suffering of innocent and oppressed individuals—in this case a young boy, and his parents—within a flawed society that is oppressed and disillusioned with life's experience.

The poem

Analysis of the poem
In this poem, Blake's titular character, a little boy, appears, by lights of Church pedantry, to have questioned religious dogma, to wit: that every person must love God more than themselves or any other; for his sacrilege the boy has instantly become "lost" to the Church. Reacting to his speech, a zealot Priest leaps to  denounce the boy and to dramatize his offense. The little boy is peremptorily castigated as a heretic and summarily burned at the stake, even though the child's age—he is a little boy, after all; he sees the world through the eyes of a child's innocence—would seemingly preclude him from comprehending the awful construing of his words (by the Priest) as heresy. On the other hand, a reader might theorize that Blake intends to portray the child as precocious and with intentions to dissent from Church teaching—perhaps the Priest thinks so. However, the actual words applied by the author to the boy's speech offers very little toward this view; instead, it is the child's innocent candor that seems to inspire his words.

Background
It appears the author has drawn the “Priest” as not merely a parish priest but as metaphor for the hierarchical powers-that-be of the Church. Certainly Blake seems to hearken back to the time when the Church wielded almost unchecked powers throughout England (and most of Europe) to judge and destroy anyone it deemed intolerable in thought or behaviour.

Blake wrote his poetry for the common man.

Structure
The poem is divided into six quatrains, all in iambic tetrameter. The first quatrain introduces the subject of love of self in the voice of an omniscient narrator; the language is highly stylized. The second quatrain is the much simpler speech of a little boy expressing his thoughts on love of God, of others, and of nature.

References

Songs of Innocence and of Experience
1794 poems